John Clifford Curry (born February 27, 1984) is an American former professional ice hockey goaltender. He played for the Hamburg Freezers of the Deutsche Eishockey Liga, and with the Pittsburgh Penguins and Minnesota Wild of the National Hockey League (NHL). He was also part of the Penguins team when they won the Stanley Cup in 2009.

Playing career

Amateur
John Curry played for the Breck School Mustangs, where he compiled a 1.80 GAA as team captain and MVP in his senior season of 2001–02. After graduating from Breck, Curry attended a year at the Taft School in Watertown, Connecticut, during which he achieved a 1.46 GAA and a .920 save percentage, and was named a New England Prep School West First Team All-Star.

After high school, Curry received offers to play for numerous Division III colleges, yet enrolled at Boston University as a walk-on third-string goaltender. In his freshman year at BU, Curry played only the final 5:10 against Niagara University, filling in for starter Sean Fields in a 5–1 victory. In the 2004–05 season, Curry became the first-string goalie, posting an 18–11–3 in-conference record, participating in his first NCAA tournament, and winning his first Beanpot final, 3–2, over Northeastern University. As a junior, Curry was named to the RBK All-American second team and was a first-team Hockey East All-Star. He started in 36 of 37 games, attaining a 24–8–4 record that included a 12-game winning streak from December 30, 2005 to February 13, 2006. The team went on to win the Hockey East Championship and Curry played in another NCAA tournament. For the season he garnered awards including Hockey East Defensive Player of the Week (four times), Player of the Week, and Goaltender of the Month. Curry was named assistant captain of the Terriers in the 2006–2007 season, his final season, yet again improving his performance statistically to date and standing out as a key player in the clutch. He again won the Beanpot final, posting a career Beanpot record of 5–0 and setting a record .985 save percentage in his final tournament. He went on to win both the Beanpot MVP and the Beanpot's Eberly Award for goaltending, holding the best recorded GAA of 0.48 with 1 goal allowed. In 2007, Curry was also named a finalist for college hockey's top-player, the Hobey Baker Award, while winning Hockey East Player of the Year and getting the Hockey East Three-Stars award. Curry's college career ended abruptly when he surrendered 5 goals on 26 shots in Michigan State's first round 2007 NCAA Tournament upset of the Terriers. Curry was inducted in the Boston University Athletic Hall of Fame in May 2014.

Professional 

Curry was signed as an undrafted free agent by the Pittsburgh Penguins on July 1, 2007. He was expected to split time with David Brown between the backup goaltending position on the organization's American Hockey League (AHL) affiliate Wilkes-Barre/Scranton Penguins and the starting position on the double-A ECHL Wheeling Nailers in the 2007–08 season.

With an injury to Pittsburgh starter Marc-André Fleury, WBS starter Ty Conklin was called up to the NHL at the beginning of December 2007, opening the door for Curry to start in WBS. In December 2007 he was named AHL Rookie of the Month, posting a GAA of 1.42 and .939% save percentage. Throughout the rest of the regular season, he established himself as the starter for the team, and was named to the AHL All-Rookie team. In the Calder Cup playoffs, Curry was solid, and backstopped his team to the finals, eventually losing to the Chicago Wolves in 6 games.

Curry was selected to travel to Sweden with the Pittsburgh Penguins as a backup to Marc-André Fleury and Dany Sabourin at the beginning of the 2008–09 NHL season but did not play. He was recalled in November due to an injury to Fleury and saw his first NHL game action on November 26 against the New York Islanders, replacing Sabourin in the second period and facing Joey MacDonald, whom he had fought in the AHL the season before. He made 11 saves in 30+ shutout minutes as part of a comeback win. Curry made his first NHL start on November 28 in a loss to the Buffalo Sabres, though he stopped 28 of 32 shots. He played 3 games before being sent back to the minors.  During the playoffs Curry was up as a spare goalie.  Curry did not dressed in the playoffs, but was included on the team picture, and awarded a Stanley Cup ring.  Curry did not play enough NHL games in 2008-09 to qualify for engravement on the Stanley Cup.

Curry was later recalled on January 11, 2010 to replace Marc-Andre Fleury against the Vancouver Canucks. Fleury who was out with a fractured finger, gave Curry his fourth career start with the Penguins. He gave up 5 goals on 14 shots, a save percentage of .643, before being benched early in the second period.

On June 16, 2011, Curry left the Penguins organization and signed a one-year contract with the Hamburg Freezers of the DEL. Curry left the Wilkes-Barre Penguins as the all-time leader in both regular season wins and post-season wins.

On November 7, 2012, while playing for the Orlando Solar Bears, John Curry was fined for dousing fans of the Gwinnett Gladiators after the game the previous Thursday with water.

On February 17, 2014, the Minnesota Wild, the NHL affiliate of the Iowa Wild, signed Curry to a one-year, two-way contract.

On April 10, 2014, Curry was the starting goalie against the St. Louis Blues. He recorded 45 saves on 47 shots, and received the first star of the game for his efforts.

Personal
John Curry is the oldest child of parents Steve and Kathy Curry. He has one younger sister, Megan Curry, who attended Amherst College; she was a forward on the Amherst Women's Ice Hockey team from 2007-2011, winning two NCAA National Championships in 2009 and 2010.

Career statistics

Awards and honors

References

External links
 

1984 births
Living people
American men's ice hockey goaltenders
Boston University Terriers men's ice hockey players
Hamburg Freezers players
Houston Aeros (1994–2013) players
Ice hockey players from Minnesota
Iowa Wild players
Las Vegas Wranglers players
Minnesota Wild players
Orlando Solar Bears (ECHL) players
People from Shorewood, Minnesota
Pittsburgh Penguins players
Quad City Mallards (ECHL) players
Undrafted National Hockey League players
Wheeling Nailers players
Wilkes-Barre/Scranton Penguins players
AHCA Division I men's ice hockey All-Americans